The City University of New York Athletic Conference (CUNY Athletic Conference or CUNYAC) is an intercollegiate athletic conference affiliated with the NCAA's Division III. Its member institutions are all located in New York City and are campuses of the City University of New York. The CUNYAC also has a community college division, affiliated with the National Junior College Athletic Association (NJCAA).

History

Chronological timeline

NCAA Division III (Senior college division)
 1978 - The CUNYAC was founded as the CUNY Athletic Directions Association (CUNYADA). Charter members included Baruch College, Brooklyn College, the City College of New York (CCNY), Hunter College, John Jay College of Criminal Justice, Lehman College, Medgar Evers College, Queens College, the College of Staten Island and York College, effective beginning the 1978-79 academic year.
 1980 - Two institutions left the CUNYAC to join their respective new home primary conferences: Brooklyn to join the Division I ranks of the National Collegiate Athletic Association (NCAA) as an NCAA D-I Independent, and Queens to join the NCAA Division II ranks as an NCAA D-II Independent, both effective after the 1979-80 academic year.
 1987 - The CUNYADA has been rebranded as the City University of New York Athletic Conference (CUNYAC), effective in the 1987-88 academic year.
 1996 - Brooklyn re-joined back to the CUNYAC, effective in the 1996-97 academic year.
 1999 - New York City College of Technology (New York City Tech) joined the senior college ranks of the CUNYAC, effective in the 1999-2000 academic year.
 2011 - New York City Tech left the CUNYAC to put its athletic program on hiatus, effective after the 2010-11 academic year.
 2015 - The University of Maine at Presque Isle (Maine–Presque Isle or UMPI) joined the CUNYAC as an affiliate member for baseball during the 2016 spring season (2015-16 academic year).
 2018 - Maine–Presque Isle (UMPI) left the CUNYAC as an affiliate member for baseball after the 2018 spring season (2017-18 academic year).
 2019 - Staten Island left the CUNYAC to join the NCAA Division II ranks and the East Coast Conference (ECC), effective after the 2018-19 academic year.

NJCAA (Community college division)
 1987 - The community college division of the CUNYAC was founded. Charter members included Bronx Community College, the Borough of Manhattan Community College, Kingsborough Community College, the New York City College of Technology (New York City Tech) and Queensborough Community College, effective beginning the 1987-88 academic year.
 1999 - New York City Tech left the community college division of the CUNYAC to join the Division III ranks of the National Collegiate Athletic Association (NCAA) and the senior college division of the CUNYAC, effective after the 1998-99 academic year.
 2002 - Hostos Community College joined the community college division of the CUNYAC, effective in the 2002-03 academic year.
 2013 - LaGuardia Community College joined the community college division of the CUNYAC, effective in the 2002-03 academic year.
 2017 - LaGuardia left the community college division of the CUNYAC to put its athletic program on hiatus, effective after the 2016-17 academic year.
 2022 - LaGuardia re-joined the community college division of the CUNYAC , effective in the 2022-23 academic year.

Member schools

NCAA Division III (Senior college division)

Current members
The senior college division of the CUNYAC currently has eight full members, all are public schools:

Notes

Former members
The senior college division of the CUNYAC had three former full members, all were public schools:

Notes

Former associate members

Former members
The senior college division of the CUNYAC had one former associate member, which was also a public school:

Notes

Membership timeline

NJCAA (Community college division)

Current members
The community college division of the CUNYAC currently has five full members, all are public schools:

Notes

Former members
The community college division of the CUNYAC had two former full members, both were public schools:

Notes

Membership timeline

Sports

NCAA Division III

The CUNYAC sponsors Division III intercollegiate athletic competition in men's baseball, men's and women's basketball, men's and women's cross country, men's and women's soccer, women's softball, men's and women's swimming and diving, men's and women's tennis, men's and women's track and field, and men's and women's volleyball.

Community college
The CUNYAC sponsors community college (NJCAA) intercollegiate athletic competition in men's baseball, men's and women's basketball, men's soccer, and women's volleyball.

References

External links